/ [1977] 1 W.L.R. 527 is an English trust law case. It sets out what will be sufficient to establish that someone has intended to create a trust, the first of the "three certainties". It is necessary that a settlor's "words and actions ... show a clear intention to dispose of property ... so that someone else acquires a beneficial interest."

Facts
Mr Constance's marriage broke down, and he moved in with Ms Paul. After a workplace accident he received £950 in damages, and following discussions with a bank manager, paid it into a new joint account. They were unmarried, so the account was just put in Mr Constance's sole name. He said repeatedly, ‘the money is as much yours as mine’. They paid in joint bingo winnings too, and they made a £150 withdrawal, which they split. But 13 months later, Mr Constance died without a will. Ms Paul claimed the account was hers. Mrs Constance reappeared and claimed the money was hers.

Judgment
The Court of Appeal held that the parties' words and conduct demonstrated that he wished for the money to be held on trust for Mr Constance and Ms Paul jointly. Scarman LJ gave the first judgment.

Bridge LJ concurred, and quoted Richards v Delbridge where Sir George Jessel MR said, "It is true he need not use the words 'I declare myself a trustee,' but he must do something which is equivalent to it, and use expressions which have that meaning, for, however anxious the court may be to carry out a man’s intentions, it is not at liberty to construe words otherwise than according to their proper meaning."

Cairns LJ also concurred.

See also

English trusts law
Barclays Bank Ltd v Quistclose Investments Ltd [1970] AC 567

Notes

English trusts case law
Court of Appeal (England and Wales) cases
1976 in British law
1976 in case law